Spinsters in Jeopardy is a detective novel by Ngaio Marsh; it is the seventeenth novel to feature Roderick Alleyn, and was first published in 1954.  The novel is set in Southern France, where Alleyn, his painter wife Agatha Troy and their young son Ricky are holidaying, although Alleyn is also tasked by his Scotland Yard superiors with meeting French police colleagues to discuss international drug trafficking through Marseilles. On the overnight sleeper train from Paris, the Alleyns witness what appears to be a fatal night-time stabbing in the illuminated window of a dramatically-set mediaeval castle overlooking the railway line. This proves to be the resort of an élite, louche group of socialites who are dabbling in Black Magic under the auspices of a smoothly dubious host and 'high priest' of a cult that clearly involves recreational drug-taking, with vulnerable wealthy women potentially exploited. Alleyn's investigations are complicated by the kidnapping of Ricky from their hotel.

The novel revisits similar themes to Marsh's earlier Alleyn mystery novel Death in Ecstasy (1936), which also concerns a suspect cult with drug-taking a part of its practice and a dubiously charismatic cult leader, although the earlier book is set in fashionable London society, not Southern France. According to Marsh's biographer Margaret Lewis, in writing both novels, Marsh drew on her knowledge of an actual 1890s scandal in her native Christchurch NZ: Arthur Bently Worthington's Temple of Truth. Lewis also says (page 147) that Marsh based the sinister chateau on a French Saracen fortress where her lifelong friends, the Rhodes family, holidayed in 1949.

The novel was published in the United States in 1953 (by Little Brown of Boston, her usual American publisher) and in 1955 in an abridged edition titled The Bride of Death (by Spivak of New York).

References

Roderick Alleyn novels
1954 British novels
Novels set in France
Collins Crime Club books
British detective novels